The 2011 Hungarian Figure Skating Championships took place between January 8 and 9, 2011 at the Budapesti Gyakorló Jégpálya in Budapest. Skaters competed in the disciplines of men's singles, ladies' singles, and ice dancing on the senior, junior, and novice levels. The results were used to choose the Hungarian teams to the 2011 World Championships and the 2011 European Championships.

Senior results

Men

Ladies

Ice dancing

External links
 2011 Hungarian Championships results

2011
2011 in figure skating
2010 in figure skating
Figure Skating Championships, 2011